Zaltzman is a surname. Notable people with the surname include:

Andy Zaltzman (born 1974), British comedian and author
Helen Zaltzman (born 1980), English podcaster, broadcaster, and writer

See also
Zaltman
Saltman (surname)